Gerald Thorne (born 1926) is a Panamanian former outfielder who played in the Negro leagues in the 1940s.

A native of Panama, Thorne played for the Philadelphia Stars in 1946. In nine recorded games, he posted four hits in 22 plate appearances.

References

External links
 and Seamheads

1926 births
Possibly living people
Date of birth missing
Place of birth missing
Philadelphia Stars players
Panamanian expatriate baseball players in the United States
Baseball outfielders